Ferar Cluj was a football club from Kolozsvár/Cluj that played both in the Hungarian and the Romanian Championship.

History

Founded in 1880 as Kolozsvári Atlétikai Club, the football section was founded in 1904 and the team first entered the Hungarian second league in 1907–1908 season. The team participated in the Eastern District of the second Hungarian league. After being runner-up three times in 1907–1908, 1908-1909 and 1911–12, they finally became district champions in the 1913–14 season, even though the season was discontinued due to beginning of World War I.

After the World War I, the city of Kolozsvár/Cluj became part of Romania, and from this time it participated in the Romanian league system. The club played in the Romanian regional championship until 1934 when it was promoted to Divizia B. It spent 2 seasons there until its 1938 relegation.

During World War II, the club played in the Hungarian National Championship and finished 3rd in the 1943–44 season. Some players used were Márky – Vass, Pall – Balint, Reinhardt, Z. Szaniszló – Fábián I, Ș. Kovács IV, L. Bonyhádi, Fülöp, and Incze II. In 1945, Ferar changed its name to Ferar KMSE, having in its midst a number of valuable players including Márky, Szoboszlay, Vass, Demeter, Z. Szaniszló, Fülöp, I. Petschovsky, Mészáros, Kovács V, Ș. Kovács IV, Pall, Reinhardt, Fábián I, L. Bonyhádi, and Blejan.

At the first postbelic season, 1946–47, under the name of Ferar, a number of players were added: Boldizsár, Farmati, Börzsei, Fuzer, Váczi, and Fernbach-Ferenczi.

In 1948, the club merged with CFR Cluj and disappeared from all records.

Honours

Liga I:
Winners (0):, Best finish: 6th 1946–47
Hungarian National Championship I:
Winners (0):, Best finish: 3rd 1943–44
Hungarian National Championship II:
Winners (1): 1941-42Transylvanian LeagueWinners (2): 1913-14, 1940-41Runners-up (3): 1907-08, 1908-09, 1911-12Hungarian Cup: Runner-up (1) :1943–44

Domestic record

Key

 Pos = Final position
 P = Played
 W = Games won
 D = Games drawn
 L = Games lost
 GF = Goals For
 GA = Goals Against
 Pts = Points

 Div A = Liga I
 Div B = Liga II
 Div C = Liga III
 Nem I = Nemzeti Bajnokság I
 Nem II = Nemzeti Bajnokság II
 Ch. Tr. = Championship of Transylvania
 p = Preliminary Round
 1R = Round 1
 2R = Round 2

 3R = Round 3
 4R = Round 4
 5R = Round 5
 GS = Group stage
 R32 = Round of 32
 QF = Quarter-finals
 R16 = Round of 16
 SF = Semi-finals
 F = Final

The players in bold''' were the top goalscorers in the division.

Seasons

Coach history
  Nicolae Kovács (1947)

References

Association football clubs established in 1918
Association football clubs disestablished in 1948
Defunct football clubs in Romania
Football clubs in Cluj County
Defunct football clubs in Hungary
Liga I clubs
Liga II clubs
Sport in Cluj-Napoca
1918 establishments in Romania
1948 disestablishments in Romania